MV Seminole was a UK motor tanker. She was built in 1921 and ran aground in the River Mersey in 1927, causing an emergency in Liverpool when part of her cargo of petrol escaped into the river. She was scrapped in 1936.

Building
Vickers Limited built Seminole in Barrow-in-Furness for the Anglo-American Oil Co Ltd, completing her in May 1921. She had twin four-stroke diesel engines which between them developed 698 NHP and drove her twin screws.

Seminole was the sister ship to MV Narragansett, which Vickers had completed in May 1920.

Grounding
On 13 December 1927 Seminole was heading up the Mersey laden with 10,000 tons of petrol to be discharged at the oil jetty at Dingle, Liverpool when she ran aground on Pluckington Bank near Brunswick Dock. At low tide some of the steel plates of her hull parted and at least 2,000 tons of her cargo escaped into the river, creating a risk of explosion and fire.

For several days the Port of Liverpool and River Mersey were in a state of emergency. Liverpool City Police sent all available officers to the landing stage to stop people from smoking. Notices were put on Mersey ferries warning people not to strike matches. In case of possible fire, Liverpool Fire Brigade laid out thousands of yards of hose and fire extinguishers were placed in readiness along seven miles of quays in the port.

Anchor Line's  liner  was at a nearby landing stage with 1,200 troops aboard her. She was moved out of the danger area.

A  pipe was connected from Seminole to a tanker in Brunswick Dock. What cargo remained in the damaged tanker was transferred to the other vessel.

Fate
In March 1936 Seminole was sold for scrap.

References

1920s in Liverpool
1920 ships
1927 in England
ExxonMobil oil spills
Maritime incidents in 1927
May 1927 events
Oil spills in the United Kingdom
Oil tankers
Ships built in Barrow-in-Furness
Ships of ExxonMobil
Ships of the United Kingdom